Agnes Victoria Michel Tosi (born 1 July 1999) is an Argentine volleyball player. She is part of the Argentina women's national volleyball team.

She participated in the 2015 FIVB Volleyball Girls' U18 World Championship, 2017 FIVB Volleyball Women's U23 World Championship, 2017 FIVB Volleyball World Grand Prix, the 2018 FIVB Volleyball Women's World Championship, and 2018 FIVB Volleyball Women's Nations League
 
At club level she played for San Lorenzo in 2018.

References

External links 

 FIVB profile
 https://www.gettyimages.com/pictures/agnes-victoria-michel-tosi-16207720#/of-usa-in-action-against-anahi-florencia-tosi-and-agnes-victoria-picture-id975160454

1995 births
Living people
Argentine women's volleyball players
Place of birth missing (living people)
21st-century Argentine women